The Alameda Wildlife Conservation Park (AWCP) is a small wildlife park situated in the Botanic Gardens in Gibraltar.

History
The Alameda Wildlife Conservation Park began in 1994 as a collection of parrots, tortoises and monkeys all confiscated from illegal traders who were passing through Gibraltar. The local Customs authorities handed these animals to the Gibraltar Ornithological and Natural History Society (GONHS).

In 1996 the Alameda Miniature Golf Course was cleared after many years of neglect and modified into a small conservation park, again entirely through volunteer help.

Today
Although the main purpose of the park was to house confiscated animals, it became apparent that, if finished properly, it could also be open to the public to make people aware not only about illegal animal trade, but also about local wildlife conservation. The park has also become important for the care of native species that are considered for future re-introduction to the Upper Rock Nature Reserve, such as the red fox, the raven and the Barbary partridge.

The park has become an important educational resource for local schools, helping to raise awareness of not only the rich local biodiversity but also of wider conservation issues.

Entrance information

The park is open all year except Good Friday, National Day (10 September) and Christmas Day. Entrance fees are used to cover general maintenance, food bills and veterinarian expenses.

Species in the park

Reptiles
Green iguana
Spur-thighed tortoise
Terrapin
Hermann's tortoise
Snapping turtle
Chinese water dragon

Mammals
Prairie dog
Barbary macaque
Pig-tailed macaque
Long tailed macaque
Cotton-topped tamarin
Prevost's squirrel
Egyptian fruit bat
Vietnamese potbelly pig
Asian small-clawed otter
Rabbit
Masked dormice

Birds
Grey parrot
Patagonian conure
Yellow fronted amazon
Orange-winged amazon
Red lory
Black lory
Monk parakeet
Mitred conure
Sulphur-crested cockatoo
Raven
Senegal parrot
Free Indian peafowl

Events

The park organizes two open days each year, in May and in October. Others events are offered by the Alameda Wildlife Conservation Park.

See also
 Gibraltar Botanic Gardens
 List of mammals of Gibraltar
 List of birds of Gibraltar
 List of reptiles and amphibians in Gibraltar

References

External links
 

Fauna of Gibraltar
Tourist attractions in Gibraltar
Conservation projects
Parks in Gibraltar